Moisés Beristáin Gutiérrez is a paralympic athlete from Mexico competing mainly in category T12 long-distance events.

Biography
Moisés Beristáin competed in three Paralympic games, his first, and most successful in 2000 where he won a gold in the 10000m, silver in the 5000m and bronze in the marathon. Despite competing in the same three events in 2004 and the 10000m and marathon in 2008 he never again won a Paralympic medal. However he continued to compete and won the 2016 Mexico City Marathon.

References

Paralympic athletes of Mexico
Athletes (track and field) at the 2000 Summer Paralympics
Athletes (track and field) at the 2004 Summer Paralympics
Athletes (track and field) at the 2008 Summer Paralympics
Paralympic gold medalists for Mexico
Paralympic silver medalists for Mexico
Paralympic bronze medalists for Mexico
Living people
Medalists at the 2000 Summer Paralympics
Year of birth missing (living people)
Paralympic medalists in athletics (track and field)
Mexican male long-distance runners
Mexican male marathon runners
Visually impaired long-distance runners
Visually impaired marathon runners
Paralympic long-distance runners
Paralympic marathon runners
21st-century Mexican people